Eric Brock may refer to:

 Eric Brock (safety) (born 1985), American football safety
 Eric Brock (American football coach), American football coach in the United States